Peanut butter is a food paste or spread made from ground dry roasted peanuts.

Peanut butter may also refer to:

Peanut Butter & Co.,  a peanut butter brand founded in 1998
"Peanut Butter" (song), a hit single for The Marathons in 1961, covered by The J. Geils Band and The Wiggles
 Peanut Butter (album), a 2015 album by Joanna Gruesome